Séraphin Moundounga  (born 29 February 1964 in Tchibanga) is a Gabonese politician who served in the government of Gabon as Minister of Justice from 2014 to 2016.

Biography
A member of the ruling Gabonese Democratic Party, he was first elected to the National Assembly of Gabon in the 1990 parliamentary election, and he was First Quaestor of the National Assembly from 1997 to 2009. From October 2009 to 2014 he served as Minister of National Education. One of his main projects was the renovation of the Omar Bongo University.

Séraphin Moundounga was appointed as Minister of Justice in January 2014. He resigned as Minister of Justice on 5 September 2016 after the government of President Ali Bongo Ondimba refused a recount of disputed votes in the 2016 presidential election. At the time of his resignation he was also Second Deputy Prime Minister. Moundounga went into exile in France shortly thereafter, alleging that the government orchestrated an invasion of his house on the night of 6–7 September; although he was not present at the house at time, he characterized it as an assassination attempt.

Settled in Europe, he became the President of the NGO UNITE (Union Pour la Nation l'Intégrité, le Travail et l'Égalité) and lobbied in favor of the revision of the Gabonese constitution. In July 2020, after a rumor of suicide spread like wildfire in the Gabonese media, Moundounga's family confirmed that he was still alive and well.

References

1964 births
Living people
Gabonese Democratic Party politicians
Government ministers of Gabon
Members of the National Assembly of Gabon
People from Nyanga Province
21st-century Gabonese people